is a Japanese former butterfly swimmer who competed in the 1988 Summer Olympics.

References

1971 births
Living people
Japanese female butterfly swimmers
Olympic swimmers of Japan
Swimmers at the 1988 Summer Olympics
20th-century Japanese women